Nallathe Nadakkum is a 1993 Indian Tamil-language mystery drama film directed by K. Shankar. The film stars Saravanan, Kaveri and Rohini, with Napoleon, M. N. Nambiar, Janagaraj, Senthil, Silk Smitha and Manorama playing supporting roles. It was released on 2 July 1993.

Plot

Prakash is a public prosecutor who lives with his widow mother. In the past, his father was sentenced to the death penalty for the crime he didn't commit. So Prakash became a lawyer to save innocent people.

Sengodan is accused of killing the village chief Meganathan in the village (Mangalapuram) festival. During the first day of his trial, Sengodan claims innocence and refuses to have a lawyer. Prakash strongly believes that Sengodan is a killer. Later, Sengodan's sister Jeeva, who is also Prakash's lover, personally meets Prakash to prove that her brother is wrongfully accused. During the second day of his trial, Prakash tries everything to save Sengodan from the capital punishment but he fails and Sengodan is sentenced to the death penalty.

Afterwards, Prakash's mother who had a heart disease dies of heart attack. During the funeral rites, a wounded man states that Sengodan is innocent and passes away in the arms of Prakash. Prakash is now determined to save the innocent Sengodan from the hanging. He takes one-month leave and goes to Mangalapuram in order to investigate this odd affair. He learns that his lover Jeeva killed herself after the verdict, and her ghost is singing the night in the village. Prakash then takes refuge at Valliammal's house. Valliammal's daughter Jaya slowly falls in love with Prakash.

Prakash starts to suspect Meganathan's brother Vikraman and Meganathan's widow Ramadevi to be the murderers. What transpires next forms the rest of the story.

Cast

Saravanan as Prakash
Kaveri as Jeeva
Rohini as Jaya
Napoleon as Vikraman
M. N. Nambiar
Janagaraj as Rami
Senthil as Boologam
Silk Smitha as Ramadevi
Manorama as Valliammal
Pasi Sathya as Vaigundam
Anuja as Thaiyalnayaki
Bhanumathi as Prakash's mother
Sumathisri as Mangalam
Saathappan Nandakumar as Meganathan
Kumarimuthu as Siruppu Singaram
Thideer Kannaiah
LIC Narasimhan
Thillai Rajan
T. K. S. Natarajan
Shanmugasundari as Anjala
Samikkannu

Soundtrack

The film score and the soundtrack were composed by Deva. The soundtrack, released in 1993, features 5 tracks with lyrics written by Vaali.

Reception
Malini Mannath of The Indian Express gave a negative review and labelled the film as "insipid".

References

External links

1993 films
1990s Tamil-language films
Indian mystery thriller films
1990s mystery thriller films
Films scored by Deva (composer)